Absa Group Limited (ABGL; formerly Barclays Africa Group Limited), and originally Amalgamated Banks of South Africa, is a South African-based financial services group, offering personal and business banking, credit cards, corporate and investment banking, wealth and investment management, as well as bank assurance.

ABGL in 2020 was the majority shareholder of 11 banks located in Botswana, Ghana, Kenya, Mauritius, Mozambique, Seychelles, South Africa, Tanzania (two entities), Uganda and Zambia. 

The group maintains representative offices in Namibia and Nigeria and also has an international office in London and New York City. As of October 2019, Absa Group Limited had assets of US$91 billion.

History

Barclays Africa Limited (1991-2017) 
Absa was founded in 1991 through the merger of financial service providers United Bank (South Africa), the Allied Bank (Souths of the Sage Group. The following year, Absa acquired the entire shareholding of the Bankorp Group which included Trustbank, Senbank and Bankfin. In the early years of this union, each bank operated under its own name. In 1998, they were fused into one single brand. A year later, Absa adopted a new corporate identity and the name was changed into Absa Group Limited.

In May 2005, Barclays Bank of the United Kingdom purchased 56.4% stake in Absa. In early 2007, the Barclays Bank acquisition of Absa was criticized by the governor of the South African Reserve Bank, Tito Mboweni who said he "had yet to see the benefits of Barclays' management of Absa".

Snakes incident 
In 2004 a disgruntled ABSA client released five puff adders into the bank's head office in Johannesburg following a six year dispute with the bank over the repossession of his car. One person was injured in the incident when their finger was bitten and the client was later convinced of aggravated assault.

Bank charges (2005-2012) 

Finweek Bank Charges Reports from 2008 through 2010 found Absa Group Limited to be the most expensive bank in South Africa. Pay-as-you-transact (PAYT) fees increased 82% from 2005 to 2010. The 2012, Finweek Bank Charges Report ranked Absa's Gold Value Bundle as the cheapest package option amongst the four banks that were compared. The report has also shown Absa's PAYT pricing structure to have reduced by 25% by 2013, leaving it third cheapest in the overall ranking at that time.

In 2013, the group acquired the entire issued share capital of Barclays Africa Limited and issued 129,540,636 Consideration Shares to Barclays Africa Group Holdings Limited (a wholly owned subsidiary of Barclays) thus increasing the shareholding of Barclays plc to 62.3%. The Consideration Shares were listed on the JSE from the commencement of trading on 31 July 2013. The name change from “ABSA Group Limited” to “Barclays Africa Group Limited” was completed in August 2013. 

In 2017, the South African Public Protector, Busisiwe Mkhwebane, found that the bailout of R1.125 billion that Absa's predecessor Bankorp Group had received between 1985 and 1992 from the Reserve Bank was illegal, and recommended that Absa be forced to pay back R2.25 billion, the current equivalent of the amount. The report was set aside by the Pretoria High Court, finding that "The public protector did not conduct herself in a manner which would be expected from a person occupying the office of the public protector." The court assessed some costs of the case personally against Mkhwebane due to her conduct, an order upheld by the Constitutional Court of South Africa in July 2019.

Absa Group Limited (2018-present) 
Barclays Bank Plc in 2018 owned 14.9 percent of Absa Group Limited. In March 2018, Barclays Africa announced the group's name would revert to Absa Group Limited, effective 30 May 2018. The company underwent rebranding in 2018, inclusive of a new logo and slogans.

Absa opened an international office in London in September 2018, then in 2019, opened another international office in New York City. As of October 2019, according to Club of Mozambique, Absa Group Limited had total assets in excess of US$91 billion. ABGL in 2020 was the majority shareholder of 11 banks located in Botswana, Ghana, Kenya, Mauritius, Mozambique, Seychelles, South Africa, Tanzania (two entities), Uganda and Zambia. In March 2022, Sello Moloko was appointed Group Chairman and Arrie Rautenbach was appointed CEO, and its fourth CEO in three years. The company had been without a CEO for eleven months after the abrupt resignation of Daniel Mminele. In August 2022, Barclays Plc sold its remaining stake in Absa, which it had acquired in 2005, selling 7.4 percent of Absa's issued capital for $620 million.

Overview and structure 

Absa Group Limited's shares are listed on the JSE Limited stock exchange. In 2020, Absa Bank Kenya and Absa Bank Botswana continue to be listed on their respective stock exchanges.

Major shareholders 
Below is the Absa Group's 10 largest shareholders as at 15 January 2019:

Subsidiaries 

 Absa Bank Limited (100%)
 Absa Financial Services Limited (100%)
 Absa Bank Botswana (67.8%)
 Absa Bank Ghana (100%)
 Absa Bank Kenya (68.5%)
 Absa Bank Mauritius (100%)
 Absa Bank Mozambique (98.1%)
 Absa Bank Seychelles (99.8%)
 Absa Bank Uganda (100%)
 Absa Bank Zambia (100%)
 National Bank of Commerce Limited (55%)
 Absa Bank Tanzania (100%)

Legal matters

ABSA v. Sweet

Mortgage loans misconduct
In South Africa, banks have to secure consent from the borrower if the bank wishes to securitise the loan, allowing the bank to bundle in the loan with other loans and sell it to new owners.

In 2014, South African courts made a number of rulings against Absa's mortgage loan division in a number of summary judgements against clients who had taken out loans with the bank and who the bank had accused of defaulting on their loans. In August 2014, Absa brought a case against James Grobbelaar and Kevin Jenzen for allegedly defaulting on their home loans. However, Absa was unable to provide proof of the loan agreements, claiming that they had been destroyed in a fire in 2009 and instead presented an unsigned blank loan agreement. 

In November 2014, Absa withdrew a case it brought in the North Gauteng High Court against Emmarentia and Monica Liebenberg for allegedly defaulting on loans taken out in 2007, with the bank being unable to provide an electronic copy of the documents. The Liebenberg's accused the bank of trying to bully them "into submission, by threatening legal costs and expenses and by pursuing a wrongful summary judgement application knowing full well the massive disputes involved."  The Liebenbergs also stated in their affidavit that the bank inflated the interest rate of the loan and charged additional fees that were never agreed to.

See also

List of companies traded on the JSE
List of companies of South Africa
List of banks
List of banks in South Africa
Economy of South Africa

References

External links 

Official website

 
Banks of South Africa
Barclays
Banks established in 1991
Financial services companies established in 1991
Companies based in Johannesburg
Companies listed on the Johannesburg Stock Exchange
South African companies established in 1991